Sergio Luis Cogo  (born 28 September 1960), known as just Sergio, was a Brazilian football player.

Club career 
He mainly played for clubs in Brazil. He also played for Pohang Steelers of the South Korean K League, then known as the POSCO Dolphins.

He was first foreign player of K League with Jose Roberto Alves.

He only appeared in K League (2 matches)

References

External links 
 

1960 births
Living people
Association football midfielders
Brazilian footballers
Brazilian expatriate footballers
Pohang Steelers players
Chinese Super League players
K League 1 players